Santosh Kumar Suman  is an Indian politician  from Bihar. He is currently Minister of Minor Irrigation and SC/ST Welfare in Government of Bihar and a member of the Bihar Legislative Council from Hindustani Awam Morcha (HAM). He is the elder son of former Bihar chief minister Jitan Ram Manjhi.

Political career 

In the elections on March 23, 11 candidates were elected unopposed. He completed Post Graduate From Political Science, College(DU) (Evening ) In 1998 and cleared U.G.C. Net In 2000.

References

Living people
Members of the Bihar Legislative Council
Lok Sabha members from Bihar
Year of birth missing (living people)
Hindustani Awam Morcha politicians
State cabinet ministers of Bihar
Indian Hindus
Dalit politicians